AnkhSVN is a free Subversion client, implemented as a source control plug-in for Microsoft Visual Studio 2005 to 2019 inclusive (but not yet 2022). It is released under the Apache License.

It provides an interface to perform the most common revision control operations directly from inside the Microsoft Visual Studio IDE.

Previous releases of AnkhSVN (1.X) support Microsoft Visual Studio .NET 2002 and 2003.

The AnkhSVN 2.0 Source Control Provider for Visual Studio 2008 and later is a nearly complete rewrite of the old AnkhSVN Add-In. This rewrite was necessary to take advantage of the new Source Code Control (SCC) Virtual Application Programming Interface (VAPI) introduced in Visual Studio 2005. This new SCC VAPI replaces the Microsoft Source Code Control Interface (MSSCCI) API of older Visual Studio releases and makes it possible to replace all SCC handling within Visual Studio. Where the old SCC API required its implementation to always follow the CheckOut-CheckIn principle, the new SCC VAPI just passes individual requests to the SCC API. This allows implementations to fully replace the usual workflow with the Update-Merge workflow Subversion usually provides.

Just like the old SCC API, the new SCC API makes the projects aware that there is a SCC provider, to which they should communicate which files are part of a projects source and which are just intermediate or output files. (AnkhSVN 1.X and other non SCC Add-Ins have to guess this for themselves). This makes AnkhSVN 2.0 (or higher) compatible with virtually every SCC capable project in Visual Studio.

AnkhSVN derives its name from the Egyptian symbol ankh, which represents the key of life.

See also 

 Comparison of Subversion clients
 Apache Subversion - an open-source application used for revision control
 VisualSVN for Visual Studio - alternative Subversion add-in for Microsoft Visual Studio.
 VsTortoise

References

External links
 
 Official development project at GitHub

Apache Subversion
Windows-only free software